Revolution Summer is a soundtrack album by Jonathan Richman, released by the Vapor Records label in 2007. The music was composed for the film Revolution Summer, directed by Miles Matthew Montalbano. The album is Richman's first soundtrack album, although he did contribute three songs to "There's Something About Mary" as well as appearing in the film, along with drummer Tommy Larkins, who also plays on this release. It is entirely instrumental, another first for Richman.

Track listing
All music composed by Jonathan Richman
 "Weeds Breaking Through The Concrete" (1:02)
 "Revolution Summer Theme" (2:01)
 "Francine's Theme" (1:31)
 "A Chill in the Night Air' (1.21)
 "Music for Next Year's Jukebox" (3:22)
 "Hipster Cafe" (1:10)
 "Vacant Lot" (5:16)
 "Hope's Theme" (1:35)
 "Francine's Theme (Reprise)" (3:43)
 "Hope's Theme (Reprise)" (0:41)
 "Weeds Breaking Through The Concrete (Reprise)" (4:03)
 "Now What?" (2:33)

Personnel
Jonathan Richman - guitars, bass, pump organ
Tommy Larkins - drums and percussion
Ralph Carney - woodwinds, violin, pedal steel
Charles Gonzalez - keyboards, bass on Music For Next Year's Jukebox

2007 soundtrack albums
Jonathan Richman albums
Vapor Records albums